Christopher DeVonte Holloman (born February 12, 1991) is a former American football linebacker in the National Football League for the Dallas Cowboys. He attended the University of South Carolina (2009–2012). He was drafted in the 6th round of the 2013 NFL Draft by the Dallas Cowboys. He played college football at the University of South Carolina. Since 2019, he has been the head football coach for South Pointe High School in Rock Hill, SC.

Early years
A native of Charlotte, North Carolina, Holloman began his high school football career at Independence High School in 2005, where he won 2 North Carolina High School Football State Championships and was a teammate of future NFL player Hakeem Nicks. In his sophomore year, he had 96 tackles and four interceptions. As a junior, he had over 50 tackles with 2 interceptions, while also playing quarterback.

As a senior, he transferred to South Pointe High School in Rock Hill, South Carolina, where he was a teammate of future NFL players Stephon Gilmore and Jadeveon Clowney. He collected 2 interceptions, 3 forced fumbles and received All-state honors. The school finished with a perfect 15-0 record and won the South Carolina AAAA Division II championship. Regarded as a four-star recruit by Rivals.com, he was listed as the No. 10 outside linebacker prospect in his class.

College career
In 2008, Holloman decommitted from Clemson University after head coach Tommy Bowden was fired and accepted a football scholarship from the University of South Carolina. As a freshman, he was a backup at strong safety, playing in 13 games (2 starts), while registering 30 tackles and one interception. As a sophomore, he was named the starter at strong safety after the fourth game, ranking third on the team with a career-high 69 tackles, while posting 2 interceptions (second on the team).

As a junior, he began the season at the "Spur" hybrid linebacker position, but switched to strong safety after 2 games. He missed 2 games and was fifth on the team with 51 tackles (33 solo), while making 4 tackles for loss, one interception and 4 passes defensed.

As a senior, he was moved back to the "Spur" position, where in 13 games he finished fourth on the team with 57 tackles (8 for loss), 3 interceptions (tied for the team lead), 4 passes defensed, 2 sacks and 2 forced fumbles.

Professional career

Holloman was selected in the 6th round (185th overall) of the 2013 NFL Draft by the Dallas Cowboys. During the preseason, he showed a knack for creating turnovers, returning a 75-yard interception for a touchdown in the Pro Football Hall of Fame game against the Miami Dolphins.

After being the backup for Justin Durant during the first six games, he missed seven games while recovering from a spine contusion he suffered in practice. Holloman returned to play in the 15th game of the season against the Green Bay Packers, with the Cowboys forced to start him at middle linebacker because of injuries, even though he had never played the position before. He would start three games, with his best production coming in the season finale against the Philadelphia Eagles, leading the team with 11 tackles and two sacks.

During the preseason game against the Baltimore Ravens on August 16, 2014, Holloman's neck was injured (his second neck injury playing football) in the fourth quarter. After visiting with doctors, he was subsequently diagnosed with a narrow spinal column condition (cervical spinal stenosis), which forced him to announce his early retirement on August 25.

Personal life
In 2014, he returned to the University of South Carolina to be a video assistant for the football team. In 2015, he was hired to be the defensive backs coach at Beaufort High School. In 2016, he was promoted to defensive coordinator. On November 13, 2017, he was named the new head coach, succeeding Mark Clifford, who stepped down after 14 years of service.
Then, on February 4, 2019, he was named head coach at his alma mater, South Pointe High School, following in the footsteps of former coach, Strait Herron.

References

External links
 
 South Carolina profile

1991 births
Living people
American football linebackers
Dallas Cowboys players
South Carolina Gamecocks football players
High school football coaches in South Carolina
Players of American football from Charlotte, North Carolina
African-American coaches of American football
African-American players of American football
21st-century African-American sportspeople